John Allen Fitzgerald Gregg CH (1873–1961) was a Church of Ireland clergyman, from 1915 Bishop of Ossory, Ferns and Leighlin, in 1920 translated to become Archbishop of Dublin, and finally from 1939 until 1959 Archbishop of Armagh. He was also a theologian and historian.

Life
Gregg was born at North Cerney, Gloucestershire, England, United Kingdom on 4 July 1873. His elder sister, Hilda Gregg was a popular novelist. He was educated at Bedford School, and at Christ's College, Cambridge, where he was a classical scholar and won the Hulsean Prize Essay competition for 1896 with The Decian Persecution.  Gregg graduated BA in 1895; MA 1898; BD 1910; BD (Dublin – ad eundem) 1911; DD (Dublin) 1913; DD (Cantab) – 1929, and was educated for the Anglican Ministry at Ridley Hall.  

He came from an Anglo-Irish family, which boasted a large number of Church of Ireland clergy within its ranks.  His grandfather, another John Gregg, had sat in the House of Lords as Bishop of Cork, Cloyne and Ross, and his uncle, Robert Samuel Gregg served briefly as Archbishop of Armagh in the 1890s after a long episcopate as Bishop of Cork, Cloyne and Ross. J A F Gregg went on to be a notable church historian.  He served as assistant curate of Ballymena under Charles d'Arcy 1896–1899, then as Curate at Cork Cathedral (1899–1906), and as Rector of Blackrock, Co. Cork (1906–1911), before being appointed in 1911 Archbishop King's Professor of Divinity in Trinity College, Dublin.  In 1915 he became Bishop of Ossory, Ferns and Leighlin, in 1920 Archbishop of Dublin.  He was accompanied by the Bishop of Cashel Robert Miller and by Protestant businessman Sir William Goulding "to see Michael Collins in May 1922, following the murders of thirteen Protestants in the Bandon valley, to ask whether the Protestant minority should stay on. Collins 'assured them that the government would maintain civil and religious liberty'." He was elected to Armagh in 1938, but refused the position largely on account of his wife's health, and Godfrey Day, Bishop of Ossory, was elected in his place.  Following Day's death in 1939, Gregg was again elected Archbishop of Armagh which post he held until his retirement in 1959.  He was married twice.  First in 1902 to Anna Jennings (died 1945) by whom he had two sons and two daughters, and secondly, in 1947, to Lesley McEndoo, younger daughter of the then Dean of Armagh. His daughter, Barbara, was a novelist. He was a supporter of the old Unionist order but encouraged his flock to make their peace with the post-1922 political realities in Ireland.

According to R. B. McDowell – "...the Church of Ireland was led (or some would say dominated) by John Allen Fitzgerald Gregg, archbishop successively of Dublin and Armagh, who might fairly be described as an instinctive conservative with, however, an awareness of contemporary trends... Gregg's bearing suggested a prince of the church or at least a prelate of the establishment... he was a scholar and a man of affairs, his administrative flair being reinforced by dignity, decisiveness, and a sardonic wit... His theological sympathies were high church, though he had been brought up an evangelical and had an Anglo-Irish distaste for ceremonial exuberance.

Selected publications
The Decian persecution; being the Hulsean prize essay for 1896
The epistle of St. Clement: bishop of Rome (1899)
The Wisdom of Solomon (1909)
The Primitive Faith and Roman Catholic Developments: Six Sermons Delivered in St Fin Barre's Cathedral, Cork, Lent, 1909
Anglican orders and the prospects of reunion (1930)
The Ne Temere Decree: A Lecture (1943)

Honours
1957: Companion of Honour

Bibliography
Seaver, George, John Allen Fitzgerald Gregg, Archbishop (Faith Press, 1963)
Simms, George, John Allen Fitzgerald Gregg, 1873–1961: An Appreciation of His Life and Times, Delivered in Christ Church Cathedral, Dublin, on 4th July 1973 Being the Hundredth Anniversary of His Birth (1973, 14 pages)

References

1873 births
1961 deaths
Irish Anglicans
Academics of Trinity College Dublin
Anglican archbishops of Armagh
Anglican archbishops of Dublin
20th-century Anglican archbishops
Anglican biblical scholars
Alumni of Christ's College, Cambridge
Bishops of Ossory, Ferns and Leighlin
Irish unionists
Members of the Senate of Southern Ireland
People educated at Bedford School
British expatriate archbishops